"The Cops Don't Know" is the first track and single from the New Millennium Blues album by Lenny Henry. It was released by Made in Soho Music in April 2016. The song was written by Lenny Henry, and the music is composed by Jakko Jakzsyk. And the official music video is produced by Chris Porter and directed by Sam Chegini. The Cops Don't Know is about racism and the police brutality in the United States. The story tells of a failure of a society to truly address the problem of fear and hate of the other. The main thrust is Black Lives Matter.

Awards 
 Plural+ FERA-LUCERO Award - Plural+ Youth Video Festival 2016
 Music Video of the Month - The Monthly Film Festival, Glasgow - 2016
 Best Music Video - ShortPole London - Summer 2016

Nominations 
 Best Music Video - Portobello Film Festival, London 2016
 Best Music Video - The Smalls Film Festival, London 2016 
 Best Music Video - Filmquest Film Festival, Utah, USA 2016
 Best Music Video - TMC London Film Festival, London 2016
 Best Music Video - Los Angeles CineFest, LA, USA 2016
 Best Music Video - Direct Short Online Film Festival 2016

References 

2016 singles
Songs about police brutality